The Spa-Francorchamps GP2 round was a GP2 Series race that ran from on the Circuit de Spa-Francorchamps track in Stavelot, Belgium.

Winners

Notes

References

GP2 Series rounds